Elchweiler is an Ortsgemeinde – a municipality belonging to a Verbandsgemeinde, a kind of collective municipality – in the Birkenfeld district in Rhineland-Palatinate, Germany. It belongs to the Verbandsgemeinde of Birkenfeld, whose seat is in the like-named town.

Geography

Location
The municipality lies on the Molkenbach in the Hunsrück.

Neighbouring municipalities
Elchweiler borders in the north on the municipality of Niederhambach and in the south on the municipality of Schmißberg.

Constituent communities
Also belonging to Elchweiler is the Ortsteil of “Alte Schule”. The homestead lies south of the village itself at the municipal boundary with Schmißberg.

Politics

Municipal council
The council is made up of 6 council members, who were elected by majority vote at the municipal election held on 7 June 2009, and the honorary mayor as chairman.

Mayor
Elchweiler's mayor is Helmut Aulenbach.

Coat of arms
The German blazon reads: Unter rot-silbern geschachtem Schildhaupt in Grün ein goldenes Elchgeweih mit Grind.

The municipality's arms might in English heraldic language be described thus: Under a chief countercompony gules and argent, vert an elk's attires fixed to the scalp Or.

The chief countercompony (that is, with two rows of squares of alternating tinctures) recalls the arms formerly borne by the “Hinder” County of Sponheim, which were “Chequy gules and argent” (that is, the whole escutcheon was covered by a checkerboard pattern of red and silver), and thereby also the Sponheims former feudal rule over Elchweiler. The elk antlers and scalp are a canting charge for the municipality's name, which literally means “Elk Hamlet” (meant here is the Eurasian elk, or moose), although this is, in fact, an example of folk etymology.

The arms have been borne since 23 September 1964.

Economy and infrastructure

Transport
To the south runs Bundesstraße 41, which leads to the Autobahn A 62 (Kaiserslautern–Trier). Serving nearby Neubrücke is a railway station on the Nahe Valley Railway (Bingen–Saarbrücken).

References

External links
 Elchweiler in the collective municipality’s webpages 

Birkenfeld (district)